This article lists major characters from the anime and manga Samurai Deeper Kyo

Main characters

Demon Eyes Kyo
 his real name is Mibu Kyo, is a legendary man known for his red, demon-like eyes, and called the "Thousand Slayer" for killing over one thousand samurai during the Battle of Sekigahara before being defeated by a young man named Mibu Kyoshiro. After his defeat, his mind fused with Kyoshiro and his body was hidden away somewhere in the forest of Aokigahara. He is very sadistic and enjoys slaughtering anyone. Over time, his bloodlust slowly decreases though he still kills without mercy. It continues to surface at times, though training with Muramasa helps fully calm him. It is during this  period he first meets Yuya, he finds himself very protective over her though handling it in a very childish manner, such as calling her "Dog face" and " Ugly". Though it is stated by Kyoshiro in the manga that he indeed likes Yuya, and shown in the anime to the extent where he saves her life whenever she is endangered, he doesn't like to admit the fact that he cares about her. In the anime, it is shown that he indeed likes Sakuya, but the manga didn't directly say that they are lovers once. Later on, Kyo is shown to lose a bit of control when Yuya was on the verge of death, due to the water dragon egg that Shinrei planted inside her heart (she only had 60 days to live until the dragon eats its way out of her heart, unless Kyo comes to find him in the Mibu Clan Territory). Also, he was enraged when Kyoshiro, in Kyo's original body (both men have swapped bodies at that time), took the dying Yuya away from him after he had defeated Nobunaga's spirit that was possessing Nozomu's body. While Yuya is injured by Nobunaga, Kyoshiro comes and saves Yuya by taking her away. This illustrates that Kyoshiro is very tender towards Yuya and likes her a bit since she is so bubbly. At this point, Kyo is in enraged and proclaimed "Give me my body and my woman back". Therefore, it is implied that Kyo and Yuya have feelings for each other and the manga gives more depth into their relationship. The anime also indirectly shows the affection that he has for her, such as letting Yuya hit him when no one else dares to since he is the thousand man slayer. In the manga, Yuya slaps him couple times, and he doesn't do anything. When he is with Yuya he lets his guard down. In the manga, Kyo is a pervert and his number 1 target is Yuya, whose breasts he loves to molest. It is extremely strange that he prefers Yuya over Okuni when Okuni is always right there for him. For once, Demon Eyes Kyo the thousand man slayer learns how to love and care for someone and change not just his bloodthirst, but also his life. This point is always stated by other characters that Yuya is his weakness and that is why Akira and Shinrei use her as a hostage to aggravate Kyo.

Kyo's weapon is Tenro, one of the "Four Great Demon Blades." It was forged by Muramasa, and it is nearly unbreakable. It teaches standard fencing skills and defense, but they are far more powerful than any of the skills of other sword styles. It is the most powerful sword school in the Mibu Clan. It utilizes attacks that can cut air and create illusions. He later learns a higher form of the style that utilizes the Four Symbols (Genbu, Seiryuu, Byakko, Suzaku and even Kouryuu), manifesting a number of different powers based upon the creatures.

Kyo is the last remaining True Mibu and has the True Red eyes, which allows him to turn into a Battle God or Demon God. After he turns into the Battle God and suppresses his battle lust, he is granted the mark, and thus the title of the Aka no Ou. Kyo was born in the Mibu village and was friends with the former Aka no Ou. Once the Aka no Ou turned evil, Muramasa took Kyo from the village so that he may grow up to be the 'hope' of the Mibu clan. Kyo travelled the world and formed the Shiseiten in order to become strong enough to return to the Mibu village and defeat the former Aka no Ou. By the end of the series, he is acknowledged as the strongest fighter in the series. In the bonus chapter of the manga Yuya and Kyo live together.

Mibu Kyoshiro
) uses her bare fists and brute strength. Combat seems to be a last resort for the two of them, as they usually use zombies to fight their battles, including a few legendary warriors as well as naked and cannibalistic women. They control the element of Wood. Saisei was killed by Akira after he defeated her ability to warp damage to her opponent, but he respected her since she was fighting so hard to protect Shinrei, whom she secretly loved. Saishi, on the other hand, was viewed as a monster by Akira, and he used his best technique to destroy every cell in her body after she used a bunny-girl costume and physical attacks.

They are significantly different in the anime, except in appearance. Saisei and Saishi are "living dolls" that have many copies that try to overwhelm Kyo and even attack Yuya. Eventually Saisei transforms her clothes into armor and a naginata (just like the manga), and absorbs Yuya. Yuya while inside the void inside Saisei is able to destroy Saisei's core, and later Saishi's core with her gun. There is no mention of Saisei being Tomoe Gozen in the anime.

Shinrei

; is an ex-member of the Goyōsei who has great loyalty to the Mibu Clan. He hates Kyo for abandoning the Mibu and ruining their plan for domination. He dislikes Hotaru (Keikoku), as the latter always provokes him and has no loyalty to the Mibu.

The eldest son of a noble man of the Mibu and his official wife, Shinrei was the rightful heir of his branch. He has been taught to be totally loyal to the Mibu and has devoted his life to them. He has a cold and serious personality; though sometimes he loses his cool easily, especially if he is provoked by Hotaru (Keikoku), his rival and half-brother.

Shinrei was told about his relation to Hotaru in his youth. After learning that fact, he has kept his eyes on his little brother from the shadows. It was Shinrei who stopped his father from sending assassins to kill Hotaru and who secretly helped Hotaru participate in the competition for a position in the Goyōsei (which is only open to competitors from noble families of the Mibu). However, he never showed himself as Hotaru's brother until his last fight with Hotaru and Kyo.

Despite their contradiction and contrast, Shinrei and Hotaru hold a strong bond between them, but they consider each other as siblings and rivals. After their final bout, their bond becomes stronger and the two even start to fight together.

Shinrei fights with a "dancing sword technique" as his fight looks much like a dance. The technique is dangerous and nearly overwhelms Kyo. Being of incredible skill, Shinrei's abilities increase as the skills of his opponent increase. The technique is based on a seemingly simple, but rather impossible, practice. He first slashes, and his opponent moves accordingly to counter his attack. While his opponent is moving to counter his attack, Shinrei redirects his attack with near impossible speed so that although it appears as if his opponent is blocking, that opponent will actually get hit instead. This is soon countered by Kyo who simply closes his eyes and "senses" Shinrei's blade. Shinrei was trained personally by Fubuki.

Shinrei's father is the founder of the Mumyou Saikyou Ryuu School of Water, so Shinrei controls the element of Water. After Kyo defeats his Dancing Sword Technique and wounds him, Shinrei forms a sword out of his own blood. His ultimate technique is the Mumyou Saikyou Ryuu, the Seven Water Split Dragon.

Shinrei's left eye becomes red in moments of great stress, in contrast to his younger brother.

Saisei's death along with Taihaku's regularly pushes Shinrei to fight.

In the end, it appears that Shinrei becomes the "leader" of the Mibu Clan and rebuilds it along with Yuan's family and the creatures from the forest. In the bonus chapter, it is revealed that he started performing with his water dragons in the rebuilt Water Dance Stage.

Taihaku
()
A true genius of combat,  is the head of the Goyōsei. He knows many things about the Mibu Clan and knows Shiina Nozomo very well. He is a very kind person who saves and secretly raises many of the Mibu "rejects". He entered the Mibu when Aka no Ou saved him in the Jiyukai of Aokigahara in the past. He is actually a human whose lifespan was lengthened by the Aka no Ou. He has incredible speed despite his appearance. He managed to severely wound Benitora before he was defeated. He was killed by Fubuki because he "betrayed" the Mibu by wanting to join Kyo in defeating them. Unlike the other four Stars, Taihaku does not hold powers over an element. Though his tattoo is of the character for gold, he doesn't wield a "golden power". Rather, Taihaku is the perfect samurai. His skills, determination, and power is unmatched by all but Benitora.

Mibu Clan related

Hitoki
Hitoki is Muramasa's sister. She is the first of Mibu Clan to get infected by the Death Disease and is the specimen for the reincarnation of the Mibu plan. She was hidden in the Aka no Ou's palace so nobody would know about the Disease. She was married to Fubuki and was the mother of Tokito.

Julian

Julian is the blacksmith of the Mibu Clan and also the father of Yuan. Gifted at making weapons, he taught Muramasa how to smith, but his fighting ability is only above average overall. Like his son, Yuan, Julian seeks to avenge his wife, Ian.

Ruru/Lulu
()
Ruru is the little girl who stays with the Sendai Aka no Ou. She chides him constantly about his mistakes, even pushing his head into a pillar. She likes playing with her toys in her left hand, making her one of the few left-handed people in the series. She also brings information to Fubuki and Hishigi. Ruru is one of the two successful Rare Breeds created by Hishigi, the other being Sasuke. Hishigi mentions that her brother (Sasuke) will destroy his laboratory. At the end of the manga, the reason why the Sendai Aka no Ou keeps her around is because she has the antibody to the death diseases (the cure and hope of the Mibu people).

Sakuya
()
Sakuya is a very powerful woman within the clan who has won the loyalties of many people, including Sanada Yukimura. She can predict the future, as she is a seer. Her brother, Shiina Nozumi, being a shaman, could see into a person's past. She had something to do with the outcome of the Battle of Sekigahara and the appearance/disappearance of Demon Eyes Kyo. In the anime, she is shown using her powers physically, and it is heavily implied that both Kyo and Kyoshiro were apparently in love with her at some point, as she was with them; in the early part of the series they are actively searching for her.

In the manga, she does not show any physical manifestations of power.  It is clarified that she had always been in love with Kyoshiro, not Kyo, and remains in love with Kyoshiro while being worried over Kyo. Kyo is, however, seen as a dear friend to her and Kyoshiro. She is yet again, shown as the initial reason for the disagreement, and eventually the body stealing/soul swapping, between Kyo and Kyoshiro.

Shiina Nozomu
Shiina Nozomu was killed by Kyoshiro four years ago in front of his adopted sister, Yuya. Nozomu was, in truth, one of the greatest shaman of the Mibu Clan. He took the young Yuya in when she was a child after he found her on the streets. This man knew the valuable secret of the Mibu Clan and it is for that knowledge that he was killed. Before dying, he transmitted this secret to his biological sister, the shaman Sakuya.

Sanada Clan and Juuyuushi

Sanada Yukimura
See Sanada Yukimura and Juuyuushi (Sanada Ten Braves).

Sanada Nobuyuki
 is Yukimura's older brother and he appears in books 2 and 4. He joined the Tokugawa Clan at Battle of Sekigahara, seeming to betray his brother, which generated much animosity between the siblings. He and Yukimura fight at the Shogun Tournament, and it is later revealed that during the fight he was actually trying to teach Yukimura a lesson. Nobuyuki never betrayed the family as Yukimura thought; he joined the other side so that no matter who becomes the Shogun, the Sanada Clan would be on the winning side and survive.

Since Nobuyuki and Yukimura both give their ages as thirty-seven and appear virtually identical, they may be twins.

In the anime, he has defected from the Sanada family to become the loyal retainer of Benitora, who stopped him from committing seppuku after his failure caused the Tokugawa clan a major strategic defeat just before the battle at Sekigahara. He fights his brother in the tournament at the capital but loses. In the end of the show, he continues to fight by Benitora's side as his lieutenant even against his own family when the other clans rebel against the Shogunate.

Mizuki
Mizuki is a friend of Yukimura who is first introduced in a flashback in volume 11. Her main desire is for her father to not be as protective of herself and her mother; it's strongly hinted that she and Yukimura were falling in love with each other. Yukimura promises to protect her, but that same evening Tokugawa attacks the city and Yukimura is unable to save Mizuki, who gives him her father's sword before dying in his arms. She correctly predicts that he will become much stronger and that there are people who need him.

Her death prompts Yukimura's inner "dragon" to awaken and turns him into a fierce "demon" who punishes evil. Even twenty years after her death, Yukimura and Saizo still mourn her and Yukimura still carries the sword she gave him.

Sanada Juuyuushi (Sanada Ten Braves)
The  are the ones who have sworn to protect Sanada Yukimura with their lives.

Sarutobi Sasuke

See Sarutobi Sasuke

Kirigakure Saizo
Kirigakure Saizo (霧隠才蔵 Kirigakure Saizō) is one of the Sanada Jyuuyuushi and also a very good ninja. He has been devoted to Yukimura since his childhood, and will even turn against other members of the Sanada clan to protect his master. He has even been critically injured defending Yukimura in battle.

Despite his devotion to Yukimura, Saizo is often exasperated by his master's casual attitude and often worries about him. But he respects and fears Yukimura's abilities and ultimately will do anything he says, and his selfless devotion has also earned Yukimura's respect and caring.

In the anime adaptation, it is strongly implied that Saizo harbors a romantic crush on Yukimura.

Anayama Kosuke

Kosuke (穴山小助)) belongs to the Sanada Jyuuyuushi. She is also the female double of Yukimura. Her main responsibility at the beginning is to remain in Kudoyama and take care of Sakuya.

In the anime, it is shown that she is in love with her master.

The Remaining Members of the Sanada Ten

Kakei Jūzō

Servant to Sanada Yukimura. He fights Chinmei with the other Sanada Jyuuyuushi.

Miyoshi Isa

Miyoshi Isa is one of the Nyūdos Brothers in the Sanada Jyuuyuushi. He can attack by himself or combine with his brother, Miyoshi Seikai. Together they form a terrible duet able to combine their attacks. They also can form into a single body. Yukimura tells them to wear glasses because their eyes are pretty and their movements always alike. They protected Sakuya in the Red Tower.

Miyoshi Seikai

Miyoshi Seikai is one of the Nyūdos Brothers in the Sanada Jyuuyuushi. He can attack by himself or combine with his brother, Miyoshi Isa. Together they form a terrible duet able to combine their attacks. They also can form into a single body. Yukimura tells them to wear glasses because their eyes are pretty and their movements always alike. They protected Sakuya in the Red Tower.

Mochizuki Rokurō

Servant to Sanada Yukimura. He is in Mount Kudoyama and acted as lining with Yukimura.

Nezu Jinpachi

Jinpachi is quite similar to Kamanosuke. He was a disciple of Shindara when he was still Sasuke of the Sanada Jyuuyuushi. Jinpachi's weapon is attached on his left arm, which looks like a blade of some sort, like two long claws.

Unno Rokurō

Servant to Sanada Yukimura. He fights Chinmei with the other Sanada Jyuuyuushi.

Yuri Kamanosuke

Yuri Kamanosuke appears when Yukimura fights Shindara. She is the cook of the group and her specialty is bear stew. She speaks with an Akita accent. She uses two large scythes as her weapons. Like the other Sanada Jyuuyuushi, Kamanosuke believes in Yukimura and will follow him until death.

Other characters

Tokugawa Ieyasu
Tokugawa Ieyasu is the father of Benitora (Hidetada) and the daimyo of the Tokugawa clan. In the manga, he is portrayed as a middle-aged man and a ruthless daimyo; he pretended to be Hattori Hanzō and used a double, a fat balding lieutenant of the Tokugawa clan, to play his role. Following the Shogun Tournament, he reveals himself to Kyo and the others. Later on in the story, he entrusts the Hokuraku Shimon to Benitora and helps Kyo defeat the former Crimson King.

In the anime, however, Ieyasu's appearance is that of double in the manga, and the Hattori Hanzō in the anime is the real Ieyasu himself in the manga. In the anime, Ieyasu is secretly being controlled by Santera, and eventually turns into a Kenyou which is killed by his son Hidetada (Benitora).

Mahiro
()
Mahiro is Muramasa's sister-in-law. Although they are not blood-related, Mahiro, her sister Mayumi, and Muramasa are like a real family. Four years ago, Mahiro arrived home and saw Kyo beside her sister's dead body, holding a bloody sword in hand. She swore to avenge her sister and became a ninja under Tokugawa Ieyasu.

She, like many characters, has a longer and larger role in the manga, assisting Benitora for a large part of the series.

In the anime, in the epilogue, she is in love with her master Benitora and is pregnant with his child 11 years after the battle against Nobunaga (Benitora says to her, "Take care. You are responsible for two now" just before final battle against the rebel clans).

Mayumi
Mayumi is Mahiro's sister and was married to Muramasa for a period of time after he escaped from the Mibu clan. She was killed four years ago by Chinmei, not Kyo (as Mahiro believes), before which she gave Kyo his sword, Tenrou (forged by Muramasa). However, Mahiro doesn't find out the truth until much later in the story.

Migeira
Migeira is not featured in the manga. He has short snow-white hair, two different colored eyes (one blue and one red), and wears a futuristic caped uniform with a dark purple bandanna covering the lower part of his face. His weapon, one of the Five Muramasas, is a 5-barreled gun called the Hashagou that he wears on his right arm. Its ammunition seems to be his soul or spiritual power.  Migeira says that the first Muramasa was taken to China, and changed by Western alchemists into the form of a gun that he later tracked down. He also has the ability to see "the future" (or more correctly, the proper timeline that historically "should" have happened) and belongs to Kyou no Miyako, a secret order dedicated to governing the path of history. Because Kyo inhabits a body with two souls, this has caused a disturbance in the time line that Migeira seeks to rectify. He seems nonchalant most of the time, but sometimes gives wise advice to the characters or speaks passionately about his own sense of justice.

Jimon

Jimon is a minor character and is one of the first to reveal Demon Eyes Kyo. Kyo shamed him at the Battle of Sekigahara by not killing him and by looking down on him like he was worthless trash. He took a job as a yojimbo to a local Daikan and killed 107 people to perfect his technique and be ready to face Kyo again to regain his honor. He is a master of Hien Ken, a move that allows him to draw his sword and strike three times in the blink of an eye. Kyo challenged him to a drawing match, although Kyo's sword was almost twice as long and had no sheath. Kyo allowed Jimon to draw first, then easily kills Jimon by cutting Jimon almost in half.

Kenyou
A breed of demonic monster that exist only in the anime. During the Battle of Sekigahara, a shooting star fell, turning the tide of victory to the Eastern Army; an explosion from the asteroid turned certain humans into monsters called Kenyou. Many villainous characters in the anime are Kenyou, to the point where no human villains seem to exist. It is never explained whether their evil intentions were originally part of their personalities, or were acquired with their mutated forms.

The kenyou are exclusively in the anime, and do not appear in the manga (where all of the characters that the anime identifies as kenyou are human with extraordinary powers). Nearly all the antagonists in the anime eventually transform into monsters, which is one of the biggest differences between the manga and anime.

References

Samurai Deeper Kyo
Samurai Deeper Kyo